The third Balkenende cabinet was the executive branch of the Government of the Netherlands from 7 July 2006 until 22 February 2007. The cabinet was formed by the Christian-democratic Christian Democratic Appeal (CDA) and the conservative-liberal People's Party for Freedom and Democracy (VVD) after the fall of the second Balkenende cabinet. The caretaker rump cabinet was a centre-right coalition and had a minority in the House of Representatives with Christian Democratic Leader Jan Peter Balkenende serving as Prime Minister. Former Liberal Leader Gerrit Zalm continued as Deputy Prime Minister and Minister of Finance.

The cabinet served during the middle years of unstable 2000s. Domestically, its primary objective was to make preparations for a snap election in 2006, but immigration was also a major point of attention. Internationally, it had to deal with the war on terror and the government support for the Iraq War. The cabinet suffered several major internal and external conflicts including, such as the resignations of Justice Minister Donner and Housing Minister Dekker following a critical rapport by the Dutch Safety Board about the fire at the Amsterdam Airport Schiphol that killed 11 people, and Immigration Minister Verdonk losing the portfolio of Immigration and Asylum following a motion of no confidence. Following the election the cabinet continued in a demissionary capacity until it was superseded by the fourth Balkenende cabinet.

Formation
Following the fall of the Second Balkenende cabinet the Democrats 66 (D66) left the coalition and the Christian Democratic Appeal and the People's Party for Freedom and Democracy formed a rump cabinet. On 1 July 2006 Queen Beatrix appointed former Prime Minister Ruud Lubbers (CDA) as Informateur to investigate the possibilities for a caretaker government. Its main tasks were the preparation of the early general election on 22 November 2006 and of the 2007 budget.

The cabinet consisted of 16 ministers and 7 State Secretaries. These positions were distributed among the coalition parties according to their size in parliament: the Christian Democratic Appeal obtained 9 ministers and 4 State Secretaries, and the People's Party for Freedom and Democracy obtained 7 ministers and 3 State Secretaries. All members of this cabinet had also served in the second Balkenende cabinet, except for Bruno Bruins (VVD) the State Secretary for Education, Culture and Science who was scheduled to succeed former State Secretary Mark Rutte (VVD) when the Second Balkenende cabinet fell unexpectedly. State Secretary for Finance Joop Wijn (CDA) and State Secretary for Foreign Affairs Atzo Nicolaï (VVD) were promoted from State Secretaries to Minister of Economic Affairs (Wijn) and Minister for Government Reform and Kingdom Relations (Nicolaï) to replace the Democrats 66 ministers of the second Balkenende cabinet.

Term
Although the constituent parties of the cabinet did not have a majority in the House of Representatives, the cabinet had full power to propose laws, each of which needed to be supported by an ad hoc majority in parliament. Such minority government are rare in Dutch politics; the previous one was the Third Van Agt cabinet from 1982 to 1983, also a rump cabinet. The Christian Democratic Appeal and the People's Party for Freedom and Democracy did have a majority (38 of 75 seats) in the Senate.

Schiphol fire
On 27 October 2005, a fire erupted at a detention center at Amsterdam Airport Schiphol, resulting in the death of 11 detainees from foreign countries. From the start, doubts were shed on the organisation of the involved government agencies. On 21 September 2006, the Dutch Safety Board presented the final report on the problems in the Schiphol prison. The report explicitly stated that "fewer or even no casualties" would have occurred if the government had upheld the legal safety standards. Based on these harsh conclusions, Minister of Justice Piet Hein Donner (CDA) responsible for prisons, and

Minister of Housing, Spatial Planning and the Environment Sybilla Dekker (VVD), responsible for government buildings resigned immediately. The mayor of Haarlemmermeer Fons Hertog, the community in which Amsterdam Airport Schiphol, is located resigned at the same day.

On 22 September 2006, two new ministers were assigned to the posts left by Donner and Dekker. Ernst Hirsch Ballin of the CDA was the new Minister of Justice. During a much earlier third Lubbers cabinet, he had held the same position, from which he resigned in 1994 after the IRT-affair. Until his appointment as Minister of Justice, he had been the president of the Council of State. A former Minister of the Environment in the first Lubbers cabinet, VVD member Pieter Winsemius resigned as a member of the Scientific Council for Government Policy and replaced Dekker as housing minister.

General amnesty
On 30 November 2006, the new parliament was sworn in, including several members of the then demissionary cabinet. Because of the election results, this House of Representatives had a majority of parties that opposed the course of the third cabinet Balkenende on important issues. One important election issue was an amnesty for a specific group of asylum seekers. This group originally consisted of 26.000 and later 38.000 people who had been in an administrative immigration process since 2001, and many of their children were raised exclusively in the Netherlands. The Minister for Integration and Immigration Rita Verdonk was looking into each of these dossiers to assess their future: either expulsion or permanent residence. On 1 December, the new House of Representatives adopted a motion to suspend all expulsions of asylum seekers from this group until a final decision on a general amnesty was made. Balkenende reacted annoyed as he stated that this ad hoc left-wing coalition (including PvdA and SP) was not a good basis for negotiations for a stable government. On 5 December, the cabinet declared not to execute this motion for three reasons: first, it claimed that a parliament which deals with a care taker cabinet cannot demand that cabinet to implement new policies; second, it argued that a general amnesty would attract more asylum seeker; third, it raised several questions on what specific groups of asylum seekers should be amnestied and what the legal consequences would be for other groups not included in the amnesty. Minister Verdonk did announce that the expulsion would be suspended until the next parliamentary debate. A majority in the House of Representatives now proposed to stop the expulsion of asylum seekers until formation talks for a new government were finished, and to allow the formation talks to solve this issue. Again, the cabinet refused to execute this motion. On 13 December, the House of Representatives decided to respond to this unwillingness by a motion of no confidence specifically oriented at Minister Verdonk. The leader of the VVD, Mark Rutte announced that if Minister Verdonk would be forced to leave the cabinet all VVD ministers would leave: leaving only seven CDA ministers in the cabinet. On 14 December, the cabinet held a meeting on how to respond to this motion: the cabinet found a solution in a portfolio reshuffle between Verdonk and Ernst Hirsch Balin, the Minister of Justice, who became responsible for immigration, while Verdonk became responsible for youth criminality. Hirsh Balin could then partially execute the House of Representatives motion calling for a temporary halt to expulsions, while the VVD could voice its opposition to this decision, breaking the principle that cabinets speak with one voice.

Cabinet Members

Trivia
 Five cabinet members had previous experience as scholars and professors: Jan Peter Balkenende (Christian Theology), Gerrit Zalm (Political Economics), Piet Hein Donner (Civil Law), Ernst Hirsch Ballin (Constitutional and Administrative Law) and Pieter Winsemius (Natural Science).
 Pieter Winsemius had earlier served as Minister of Housing  before in the First Lubbers cabinet.

References

External links
Official

  Kabinet-Balkenende III Parlement & Politiek
  Kabinet-Balkenende III Rijksoverheid

Cabinets of the Netherlands
2006 establishments in the Netherlands
2007 disestablishments in the Netherlands
Cabinets established in 2006
Cabinets disestablished in 2007
Caretaker governments
Minority governments